Short Creek is a stream in Louisa and Des Moines counties, Iowa, in the United States. It is a tributary of the Iowa River.

Short Creek was so named for pioneer Smith, who settled on the creek.

See also
List of rivers of Iowa

References

Rivers of Des Moines County, Iowa
Rivers of Louisa County, Iowa
Rivers of Iowa